George McFarland was an American actor. Other people with the name include:

George B. McFarland, an American physician in Siam
George F. McFarland, an American Civil War army officer